Tissot may refer to:

Miscellaneous

 Tissot, Swiss watchmaking firm founded in 1853, now a brand of the Swatch Group
 Tissot's indicatrix, method of comparing map projections devised by Nicolas Auguste Tissot
 Mathey-Tissot, Swiss watchmaking firm founded in 1886
 "tissot" is the codename of the Xiaomi Mi A1 smartphone (some refer it as "tissot_sprout")

People
 François-Noël Babeuf (1760–1797) French political agitator who adopted the pseudonym "Tissot"
 Alice Tissot (1890–1971), French actress
 Arnold Robert-Tissot (1846–1925), Swiss politician
 Camille Tissot (1868–1917), French naval officer and pioneer of wireless telegraphy
 Charles Revol-Tissot (1892–1971), French World War I flying ace
 Clément Joseph Tissot (1747–1826), French physician and physiotherapist
 Émilie Tissot (born 1993), French race walker
 Ernest E. Tissot Jr. (1927–2019), American rear admiral and naval aviator
 Fabien Tissot (born 1972), French football manager and player
 Fred Tissot (born 1995), Tahitian footballer
 James Tissot (1836–1902), French painter
 Janou Tissot (born 1945), French equestrian show jumper, née Lefèbvre
 Justin Tissot, Swiss weightlifter
 Marie Adèle Pierre Jules Tissot (1838–1883), French mining engineer
 Maxim Tissot (born 1992), Canadian soccer player
 Nicolas Auguste Tissot (1824–1897), French cartographer
 Pierre François Tissot (1768–1854), French man of letters and politician
 Randy Tissot (1944–2013), American stock car racing driver
 Raymond Tissot (1919–1985), French javelin thrower
 Samuel-Auguste Tissot (1728–1797), Swiss physician
 Stéphane Tissot (born 1979), French alpine skier
 Sylvie Tissot (born 1971), French sociologist, activist and documentary filmmaker